Lakshmi Menon (born 4 November 1981) is an Indian model.

Career
She initially took up modelling to earn money while studying for a degree in sociology at the Bangalore University. 

She started modeling full-time after college, but although she worked in India for several years, she didn't have much success. After modelling in India for several years, she began her international career in 2006 after Jean Paul Gaultier saw her work in an Indian magazine while looking for an Indian model to walk in his Chanel show in Paris. A show for Jean Paul Gaultier was followed by work on the Hermès catwalk and campaigns for Hermès, Max Mara, Givenchy, H&M, J Crew, Bergdorf Goodman, Bloomingdales, Neiman Marcus, and Nordstrom.

Menon was featured in French Vogue editorial for the first time in October 2008, after her Milan show for La Perla, in which she walked for D&G and Givenchy. She has also appeared in editorials for American, Spanish, Indian, and French Vogue, Harper's Bazaar, V Magazine, Dazed & Confused, Indian Elle, and Allure. She won the "This year’s Model" crown awarded by Vogue for 2008. She was also in the Top 10 Newcomers by Style.com and on the cover of Elle the same year.

She’s worked with Jean Paul Gaultier, Hermes, Chanel -- and is the face of the future." Vogue said in 2008 that she was "quite the embodiment of Givenchy's new-season style".

She featured in the 2011 Pirelli Calendar, photographed by Karl Lagerfeld and is the first Indian model to feature in a Pirelli calendar.

Personal life
She was in a relationship with photographer Prabuddha Dasgupta. She was in a relationship with architect Bijoy Jain in 2013.

In December 2018, she married Suhel Seth. They have one daughter.

References

1981 births
Living people
Indian female models
Female models from Kerala
Bangalore University alumni